Mizaga is a genus of West African cribellate araneomorph spiders in the family Dictynidae, and was first described by Eugène Simon in 1898.  it contains only two species, both found in Senegal: M. chevreuxi and M. racovitzai. Originally placed with the funnel weavers, it was moved to Dictynidae in 1967.

References

Araneomorphae genera
Dictynidae
Spiders of Africa
Taxa named by Eugène Simon